On 1 May 2004, the European Council was substantially altered by the accession of 10 new member states.

See instead:
Parties in the European Council between January and April 2004
Parties in the European Council between May and December 2004